Manuela Arriola Rubio (6 March 1919 – 27 November 2004), known by her stage names Manolita Arriola and Manuelita Arriola (and their alternate spellings, Manolita Arreola and Manuelita Arreola, respectively), was a Mexican singer and actress. Known for her versatility as a singer, she was nicknamed La Versátil (The Versatile Woman).

Biography

Manuolita Arriola recorded more than 150 songs in various genres, such as ranchera, bolero, corrido, tropical, and tango. She was the first performer of the famous Pedro Flores bolero "Amor perdido". She recorded for the RCA Víctor, Peerless, Columbia, and Coro labels. She also collaborated with the noted Mexican tenor Nestor Mesta Chayres and the Los Panchos Trio for CBS Radio on La Cadena de las Americas (Network of the Americas) for the Viva America program in 1946.

Discography

Compilation albums
 Serenata tropical (Eco Records, 1967)
 Boleros del recuerdo (Coro Records, 1967)
 Manolita Arreola (Eco Records, 1974)

References

External links
 
 Manuolita Arriola on Discography of American Historical Recordings

1919 births
2004 deaths
20th-century Mexican actresses
Mexican film actresses
20th-century Mexican women singers